The Most Glorious Mahendra Chain ( Mahendra Mala Manapadvi) is a royal decoration of Nepal.

History 
It was instituted on 26 February 1961 by the King Mahendra Bir Bikram Shah Dev.

Grades
It is awarded in only one class, the Chain, to reigning sovereigns.

Recipients
 Queen Elizabeth II of the United Kingdom
 King Birendra
 Queen Aishwarya
 King Gyanendra
 Queen Komal

External links
 World Medals Index, Nepal: Mahendramala Manapadvi

References 

Mahendra Chain
Mahendra Chain
1961 establishments in Nepal